Ksenia Lykina and Emily Webley-Smith were the defending champions, but both players chose not to participate.

Monique Adamczak and Olivia Rogowska won the tournament, defeating Kamonwan Buayam and Zuzana Zlochová in the final, 6–2, 6–4.

Seeds

Draw

References 
 Draw

Launceston Tennis International - Doubles
Launceston Tennis International
Launceston Tennis International - Doubles